San Marino participated in the 2010 Summer Youth Olympics in Singapore.

The San Marino squad consisted of 4 athletes competing in 4 sports: judo, sailing, shooting and table tennis.

Judo

Individual

Team

Sailing

One Person Dinghy

Shooting

Pistol

Table tennis

Individual

Team

References

External links
Competitors List: San Marino

2010 in Sammarinese sport
Nations at the 2010 Summer Youth Olympics
San Marino at the Youth Olympics